Peregrine Thomas Hopson (5 June 1696 – 27 February 1759) was a British army officer who commanded the 40th Regiment of Foot and saw extensive service during the eighteenth century and rose to the rank of Major General. He also served as British commander in Louisbourg during the British occupation between 1746–1749, then became Governor of Nova Scotia and later led a major expedition to the West Indies during the Seven Years' War during which he died.

Hopson is perhaps best known for signing the Peace Treaty of 1752 the Edward Cornwallis created with Mi'kmaq chief Jean-Baptiste Cope which is celebrated (along with other treaties) every year by Nova Scotians on Treaty Day.

Early career
Hopson was born on 5 June 1696, the second son of vice admiral Sir Thomas Hopsonn and Elizabeth Timbrell. He initially joined the Royal Marines in 1703, but later transferred to join the British Army. He rose his way up to Lieutenant Colonel by 1743, serving mainly in Gibraltar.

Louisbourg (1746-49)

Following Colonel Hugh Warburton, in the Spring of 1746 Hopson arrived in Louisbourg, Nova Scotia with a number of reinforcements intending to relieve the existing British garrison. The settlement had only been captured from the French the previous year.  From 1747 until 1749 he served as commander of the town, until it was handed back as part of the Treaty of Aix-la-Chapelle. On 12 July 1749 he formally handed over the town to the returning French troops.

Governor of Nova Scotia

During Father Le Loutre's War, Hopson served as Governor of Nova Scotia (1752–1754) from the British capital of Halifax. While combating the Mi'kmaq and Acadian raids, he maintained relatively good relations with the French at Louisbourg and Quebec.  Edward Cornwallis created the Treaty of 1752, which Hobson and Jean-Baptiste Cope signed. Hobson then sent the delegation that ended in the Attack at Isle Madame, which led to Cope destroying the treaty.

Seven Years' War

Canada
Once a fresh war broke out with France in 1756, Hopson returned to Halifax and helped organise the British response to the threat of a French attack. He also played a role in the Great Upheaval of French-speaking inhabitants of Nova Scotia before returning home to Britain. He was passed over for a role in the large British attempt to capture Louisbourg in 1758.

West Indies

Instead he was appointed to command a major expedition to the West Indies. The campaign was a central part of William Pitt's strategy to win the war, by seizing profitable French colonies in the Caribbean. Hopson's choice was particularly favoured by George II, while opposed by Pitt who insisted on appointing one of his own protégés John Barrington as second-in-command.

Hopson sailed from Portsmouth in 1758 with 9,000 troops. Once in the West Indies the British set up Barbados as a base to strike out against the two main French targets Martinique and Guadeloupe. However the British attempt to capture Martinique ended in failure, with heavy casualties and growing rates of disease and the British were forced to switch their attentions to Guadeloupe. As they attempted to capture the island, the British were hit by a wave of diseases, and 1,500 men swiftly fell ill. Hopson also contracted a tropical disease and died in February 1759. His force fell under the command of Barrington, who successfully completed the capture of Guadeloupe two months later.

References

Bibliography
 Anderson, Fred. Crucible of War: Faber and Faber, 2000
 McLynn, Frank. 1759: The Year Britain Became Master of the World. Pimlico, 2005

1696 births
1759 deaths
British Army personnel of the War of the Austrian Succession
British Army personnel of the Seven Years' War
British military personnel of the French and Indian War
British Army major generals
West Yorkshire Regiment officers
48th Regiment of Foot officers
Worcestershire Regiment officers
Governors of the Colony of Nova Scotia
People of Father Le Loutre's War